Léon Bary (6 June 1880 – 7 January 1954) was a French actor. He appeared in more than 50 films between 1916 and 1955. He was born in Paris, France, and died in Paris, aged 73.

Selected filmography

References

External links

1880 births
1954 deaths
Burials at Père Lachaise Cemetery
French male film actors
French male silent film actors
Male actors from Paris
20th-century French male actors